The 2021 WGC-Workday Championship was a golf tournament that was played February 25–28 at The Concession Golf Club in Bradenton, Florida. It was the 22nd and final time the WGC Championship has been played and the first of the World Golf Championships events to be staged in 2021. The event was originally scheduled to take place in Mexico, but due to the COVID-19 pandemic, the event was moved to Florida in January 2021. On February 16, it was announced Workday, Inc. would become the new title sponsor.

Collin Morikawa won the event by three strokes over Billy Horschel, Viktor Hovland, and Brooks Koepka.

Course layout
The Concession Golf Club

Field
The field consisted of players from the top of the Official World Golf Ranking and the money lists/Orders of Merit from the six main professional golf tours. Each player is classified according to the first category in which he qualified, but other categories are shown in parentheses.

1. The top 50 players from the Official World Golf Ranking, as of February 15, 2021:

Abraham Ancer (2,3)
Daniel Berger (2,3)
Christiaan Bezuidenhout (2,5)
Jason Day (2)
Bryson DeChambeau (2,3)
Harris English (2,3,4)
Tony Finau (2,3,4,6)
Matt Fitzpatrick (2,5)
Tommy Fleetwood (2,5)
Sergio García (2)
Tyrrell Hatton (2,3,5,6)
Billy Horschel (2,3)
Viktor Hovland (2,3,4)
Im Sung-jae (2,3,5)
Dustin Johnson (2,3,4)
Kevin Kisner (2,3)
Brooks Koepka (2)
Jason Kokrak (2)
Matt Kuchar (2)
Marc Leishman (2,3)
Shane Lowry (2)
Robert MacIntyre (2,6)
Hideki Matsuyama (2,3)
Rory McIlroy (2,3,5,6)
Collin Morikawa (2,3,5)
Kevin Na (2,3)
Joaquín Niemann (2,3,4)
Louis Oosthuizen (2,5)
Carlos Ortiz (2,4)
Ryan Palmer (2,3)
Victor Perez (2,5)
Jon Rahm (2,3)
Patrick Reed (2,3,5)
Justin Rose (2,6)
Xander Schauffele (2,3,4)
Scottie Scheffler (2,3)
Adam Scott (2)
Webb Simpson (2,3)
Cameron Smith (2,3)
Justin Thomas (2,3,4)
Brendon Todd (2,3)
Bubba Watson
Lee Westwood (2,5)
Bernd Wiesberger (2)
Matthew Wolff (2,3)
Gary Woodland (2)
Will Zalatoris (2)

 Patrick Cantlay (2,4), Paul Casey (2,5,6) and Tiger Woods (2) did not play.

2. The top 50 players from the Official World Golf Ranking, as of February 22, 2021:

Max Homa (4)

3. The top 30 players from the final 2020 FedExCup Points List:

Cameron Champ
Lanto Griffin
Mackenzie Hughes
Sebastián Muñoz

4. The top 10 players from the 2021 FedExCup Points List, as of February 22, 2021:

5. The top 20 players from the final 2020 European Tour Race to Dubai:

Laurie Canter
Thomas Detry
Lucas Herbert
Rasmus Højgaard
Aaron Rai
Andy Sullivan
Sami Välimäki
Erik van Rooyen

6. The top 10 players from the 2021 European Tour Race to Dubai, as of February 8, 2021:

Rafa Cabrera-Bello
David Lipsky
Jason Scrivener
Brandon Stone

7. The top 2 players, not otherwise exempt, from the 2020–21 Japan Golf Tour Order of Merit, as of December 31, 2020:

Yuki Inamori
Chan Kim

8. The top 2 players, not otherwise exempt, from the 2020–21 PGA Tour of Australasia Order of Merit, as of December 31, 2020:

Brad Kennedy
Min Woo Lee

9. The top 2 players, not otherwise exempt, from the final 2019–20 Sunshine Tour Order of Merit:

J. C. Ritchie
Daniel van Tonder

10. The top 2 players, not otherwise exempt, from the 2020–21 Asian Tour Order of Merit, as of December 31, 2020:

Wade Ormsby
Trevor Simsby

11. The highest ranked available player from Mexico from the Official World Golf Ranking as of February 15, 2021. If the highest ranked available player from Mexico from the Official World Golf Ranking is otherwise eligible, the next highest ranked available player from Mexico within the top 300 on the Official World Golf Ranking as of February 15, 2021

12. The highest ranked players not otherwise qualified from outside the top 50 in the Official World Golf Ranking, as of February 22, 2021, to bring the field up to 72 players:

Round summaries

First round 
Thursday, February 25, 2021

Second round 
Friday, February 26, 2021

Third round 
Saturday, February 27, 2021

Final round 
Sunday, February 28, 2021

Final leaderboard

References

External links

Coverage on the European Tour's official site
Media Guide
GCSAA tournament fact sheet

WGC Championship
WGC-Workday Championship
WGC-Workday Championship
WGC-Workday Championship
WGC-Workday Championship